Marques or Marqués may refer to:

 Marques (grape), another name for the Spanish Portuguese wine grape Loureira
 Bark Marques, a tall ship

People
Marques (surname), a Portuguese surname
Marqués (surname), a Castillian and Catalan surname
Marques Batista de Abreu (born 1973), Brazilian footballer
Marques Bragg (born 1970), American basketball player
Marques Brownlee (born 1993), Internet personality
Marques Colston (born 1983), American football player
Marques Green (born 1982), American-born Macedonian basketball player
Marques Hagans (born 1982), former American football player
Marques Haynes (1926–2015), American basketball player
Marques Houston (born 1981), American R&B singer and actor
Marques Johnson (born 1956), American basketball player
Marques Ogden (born 1980), American football player
Marques Sullivan (born 1978), American football player
Marques Townes (born 1995), American basketball player
Marques Tuiasosopo (born 1979), American football player and coach

Places
Marques, Seine-Maritime, a town in France
Lourenço Marques, former name of Maputo, capital city of Mozambique

See also
 Marque or brand, marketing methods of a company
 Marque (disambiguation)
 Marquese, given name
 Marquess (disambiguation)
 Marquee (disambiguation)
 Márquez (disambiguation)
 Marquis (disambiguation)